Ivan Sergeyevich Leontiev (2 March 1782–2 August 1824) was an Imperial Russian general who fought in the Napoleonic Wars. In December 1812 he was promoted to Major General and made commander of the 1st Brigade of the 2nd Cuirassier Division under Baron Duka and fought at the battles of Lützen and Bautzen.

See also
List of Russian commanders in the Patriotic War of 1812

References

1782 births
1824 deaths
Imperial Russian major generals
Russian commanders of the Napoleonic Wars
Recipients of the Order of St. George
Recipients of the Gold Sword for Bravery